Necator is a genus of nematodes that includes some species of hookworms. Necator americanus causes necatoriasis.

See also 
List of parasites (human)

References

External links 
 

Strongylida
Rhabditida genera
Taxa named by Charles Wardell Stiles